Ballyedmond is a small village and townland in County Wexford in Ireland. It is situated on the R741 regional road. 

According to the 2016 census, the small village had a population of 121, up slightly from 116 inhabitants as of the 2011 census.

See also
 List of towns and villages in Ireland

References

Towns and villages in County Wexford